Maurice Paul may refer to:

 Maurice M. Paul (1932–2016), American lawyer and judge
 Maurice Paul (footballer) (born 1992), German football goalkeeper

See also
 Paul (father of Maurice) (died 593), father of Maurice, Byzantine Emperor
 Maurice Paul Auguste Charles Fabry (1867–1945), French physicist
 Paul Adrien Maurice Dirac (1902–1984), English theoretical physicist
 Paul Maurice Zoll (1911–1999), American cardiologist
 Maurice Paul Delorme (1919–2012), French prelate
 Paul Maurice (born 1967), Canadian ice hockey player
 Maurice and Paul Marciano Art Foundation, California arts foundation